Brovchenko is a Ukrainian surname. Notable people with the surname include:

 Viktor Brovchenko (born 1976), Ukrainian footballer
 Yuriy Brovchenko (born 1988), Ukrainian footballer

See also

 

Ukrainian-language surnames